Bjarne Daniel Solli (7 November 1910  –  22 October 1989) was a Norwegian politician for the Labour Party.

He was born in Lenvik.

He was elected to the Norwegian Parliament from Troms in 1954, and was re-elected on one occasion.

Solli was mayor of Lenvik municipality between 1945 and 1953, and served a last period 1953–1955 as a member of the executive committee of the municipality council.

References

1910 births
1989 deaths
Labour Party (Norway) politicians
Members of the Storting
20th-century Norwegian politicians
People from Lenvik